The men's 4 x 400 metres relay at the 1998 European Athletics Championships was held at the Népstadion on 22 and 23 August.

Medalists

Results

Heats
Qualification: First 3 in each heat (Q) and the next 2 fastest (q) advance to the Final.

Final

References

Results
[ Results] 
Results

Relay
4 x 400 metres relay at the European Athletics Championships